LeRoy Walter Majtyka (born June 1, 1939) is a retired American infielder and manager in minor league baseball. He also spent three seasons in the Major Leagues as a coach with the Atlanta Braves.

Majtyka was born in Buffalo, New York. He graduated from Buffalo's St. Francis High School in 1958 and attended the University at Buffalo.

In his best season, he batted .281 in 445 at bats with 7 home runs and 57 runs batted in playing for the Tulsa Oilers of the Texas League.

His  St. Petersburg Cardinals won the Florida State League championship and Majtyka was cited as Manager of the Year in the Eastern League for leading the  Trois-Rivières Aigles to a division title.

His three seasons (1988–1990) as a coach with the Braves were the only interruption to a minor-league managerial career (1968–1987; 1991–1997) in which his teams won 1,832 games and lost 1,747, for a winning percentage of .512.

He was in the South Atlantic League Hall of Fame because he ranks in the top 20, all-time, for wins by a minor league manager.

References

 Howe News Bureau, Detroit Tigers 1983 Organization Book
 Johnson, Lloyd, ed., The Minor League Register. Durham, N.C.: Baseball America, 1994.
 Johnson, Lloyd and Wolff, Miles, eds., The Minor League Encyclopedia, 3rd edition. Durham, N.C.: Baseball America, 2007.

1939 births
Living people
Arkansas Travelers players
Atlanta Braves coaches
Billings Mustangs players
Birmingham Barons managers
Indianapolis Indians managers
Jacksonville Suns players
Keokuk Cardinals players
Lewiston Broncs players
Major League Baseball third base coaches
Toledo Mud Hens players
Tulsa Oilers (baseball) players
Winnipeg Goldeyes players
Buffalo Bulls baseball players